Chi Lăng Stadium was a multi-purpose stadium in Đà Nẵng, Vietnam.

Built on the banks of the Hàn River in 1954, the stadium played host to a number of memorable games, most notably Vietnam's 3–2 win over China at the 2000 AFC U-17 Championship, featuring goals from future star Phạm Văn Quyến.

The stadium was also used for the opening and closing ceremonies of the 2016 Asian Beach Games.

The stadium was the home stadium of SHB Đà Nẵng of the V-League until 2016, when the club moved to the Hòa Xuân Stadium. The stadium was demolished in early 2018 to make way for two 33-story apartment complexes.

References

Football venues in Vietnam
Multi-purpose stadiums in Vietnam
Buildings and structures in Da Nang
Tourist attractions in Da Nang
Sports venues completed in 1954
1954 establishments in Vietnam